St. Francis Medical Center is a hospital in Milwaukee, Wisconsin operated by Ascension Healthcare.

References

External links
St. Francis Medical Center Official Website

Hospital buildings completed in 1956
Hospitals in Wisconsin
Buildings and structures in Milwaukee
Franciscan hospitals
Hospitals established in 1956
Catholic hospitals in North America